It's Up To You is the second and final studio album by Australian girl group Girlfriend. The album was released in October 1993 and peaked at number 29 on the ARIA chart. The album was certified gold.

At the ARIA Music Awards of 1994, Girlfriend were nominated for ARIA Award for Best Pop Release, losing out to Peter Andre by Peter Andre.

Track listing

Charts

Weekly charts

Certifications

References

1993 albums
Girlfriend (band) albums